Luis Karim Toledo Cuesta (born 3 December 1964) is a Mexican middle distance runner who competed in the 1992 Summer Olympics.

References

1964 births
Living people
Mexican male middle-distance runners
Olympic athletes of Mexico
Athletes (track and field) at the 1992 Summer Olympics
Universiade medalists in athletics (track and field)
World Athletics Championships athletes for Mexico
Central American and Caribbean Games gold medalists for Mexico
Athletes (track and field) at the 1987 Pan American Games
Competitors at the 1990 Central American and Caribbean Games
Universiade bronze medalists for Mexico
Central American and Caribbean Games medalists in athletics
Medalists at the 1987 Summer Universiade
Pan American Games competitors for Mexico
20th-century Mexican people